Rita Bahuguna Joshi (born 22 July 1949) is an Indian politician and was cabinet minister in the Government of Uttar Pradesh. She was the president of the Uttar Pradesh Congress Committee from 2007 to 2012. She is the daughter of Hemwati Nandan Bahuguna, a former Chief Minister of the Indian state of Uttar Pradesh. She joined Bharatiya Janata Party on 20 October 2016. She was elected to the Lok Sabha, lower house of the Parliament of India from Allahabad, Uttar Pradesh in the 2019 Indian general election as a member of the Bharatiya Janata Party.

Early life
Rita Bahuguna Joshi is daughter of Late H. N. Bahuguna, former Chief Minister of U.P. Her mother, Late Kamla Bahuguna, was an ex-MP. She holds an MA and a PhD in History and is a professor in Medieval and Modern History at the University of Allahabad. She is also a recipient of a United Nations Award of Excellence as being among the "Most Distinguished Women Mayor in South Asia". She authored two history books before joining the Indian National Congress. She was also a professor in Medieval and Modern History at the University of Allahabad.

Political career
Rita Bahuguna held the post of mayor of Allahabad from 1995–2000. She is a former vice-president of the National Council of Women, has been president of the All India Mahila Congress since 2003 and of the Uttar Pradesh Congress Committee since September 2007. She has twice contested unsuccessfully in elections to the Lok Sabha. the lower house of the Parliament of India. She was elected a Member of the Legislative Assembly for the Lucknow Cantonment in the 2012 state elections.. She contested the 2014 Lok Sabha elections from Lucknow and lost.

She joined BJP on 20-Oct-2016 in presence of BJP president Amit Shah after spending 24 years in Congress.

Arrest
On 16 July 2009, she was detained for allegedly making derogatory remarks about Uttar Pradesh Chief Minister Mayawati. She was later sent to the Moradabad jail on 14 days' judicial custody.

Joshi's speech was about the law and order situation in Uttar Pradesh and the increasing number of rapes in the state. She cited a few cases in which some women were paid 25,000 rupees compensation after being raped. She remarked that simply compensating the women with money was not enough. Women who are raped should "throw the money at Mayawati's face and tell her 'you should also be raped and I will give you 10 million rupees" she said in the speech.

She was one of the party leaders arrested by the Meerut range police on 11 May 2011 from the Bhatta Parsaul village of western Uttar Pradesh along with the fellow leaders Rahul Gandhi and Digvijay Singh. They were taking part in an agitation staged by the local farmers condemning the state government policies. A top police officer of the range confirmed their detention to the media adding that they were about to produce the trio to a local court on the following working day.

Personal life
Rita Bahuguna Joshi is married to P C Joshi, a mechanical engineer from Patrice Lumumba University and has a son, Mayank Joshi. She has two brothers Vijay Bahuguna was the Chief Minister of Uttarakhand and Shekhar Bahuguna who had contested 2012 assembly election but could not succeed from Phaphamau constituency in Allahabad, U.P.

Mrs. Rita Bahuguna has worked in the favour of Indian women as the President of All India Mahila Congress from 2003 to 2008. She was involved in Women's Movement at the Grass-root level and organized several seminars, demonstrations etc. for women. She actively led the Movement for Reservation for Women in Local Bodies in U.P. in 1991–92. In her struggles to fight the injustices against women, she was jailed in 2009 for protesting against increased incidents of rape on women in U.P. Her efforts to relieve the plight of women in U.P. got her awarded the U.N. Award of Excellence as "Most Distinguished Women Mayor in South Asia" at Phitsanulok, Thailand in June in 2001.

Rita Bahuguna Joshi suffered a personal tragedy, during the Diwali festival, of 2020, when her six-year old granddaughter, Kiya Joshi, daughter of her son Mayank, died in Prayagraj, after sustaining burns while playing with diyas.

References

External links 

 Rita Bahuguna Joshi

Indian National Congress politicians from Uttar Pradesh
Living people
Mayors of Allahabad
Uttar Pradesh MLAs 2012–2017
Uttar Pradesh MLAs 2017–2022
1949 births
United Progressive Alliance candidates in the 2014 Indian general election
Women in Uttarakhand politics
Women in Uttar Pradesh politics
Bharatiya Janata Party politicians from Uttar Pradesh
20th-century Indian historians
Indian women historians
Women educators from Uttarakhand
Educators from Uttarakhand
20th-century Indian educators
21st-century Indian educators
20th-century Indian women scientists
20th-century Indian scientists
21st-century Indian women politicians
21st-century Indian politicians
20th-century Indian women politicians
20th-century Indian politicians
21st-century Indian women scientists
21st-century Indian scientists
State cabinet ministers of Uttar Pradesh
Yogi ministry
India MPs 2019–present
Women mayors of places in Uttar Pradesh
20th-century women educators
21st-century women educators